Gou is a Chinese surname. In 2013, it was the 225th-most common surname, shared by around 430,000 people, comprising 0.032% of the total population, with the province with the most people sharing the surname being Sichuan.

Notable people
 Christine Kuo (Chinese: 苟芸慧; pinyin: Gǒu Yúnhuì, 1983-) a Taiwanese-Canadian actress based in Hong Kong
 Empress Gou (苟皇后, personal name unknown) an empress of the Chinese/Di state Former Qin. Her husband was Fu Jiān
 Gou Zhongwen (Chinese: 苟仲文; born June 1957) is a Chinese politician, serving since 2017 as the director of the State General Administration of Sports

See also
 Terry Gou, (郭台銘, Guo Taiming) Chairman and CEO of Foxconn (Hon Hai Technology Group)

Chinese-language surnames
Individual Chinese surnames